Atlantska plovidba d.d. is a Croatian shipping company.  Founded in 1955 in Dubrovnik, the company works mostly in the dry bulk and heavy lift markets, serving both domestic and international clients

History

The history of Atlantska plovidba is tied closely to that of Dubrovnik. In addition, Dubrovnik had a financial stake in 30% to 60% of the remaining Yugoslav steamship companies. However, by the end of World War II, only nine ships totalling  survived.

These nine ships were nationalized and given to the Yugoslav company Jugolinija based in Rijeka, leaving Dubrovnik with no merchant fleet. After several years, citizens of Dubrovnik petitioned Yugoslavia's State Executive Committee to denationalize the fleet. The state agreed, and as a result, Atlantska plovidba was founded May 27, 1955.

In the beginning, the company was given seven tramp steamers totaling . These ships burnt coal, were capable of six to eight knots, and were, on average, 35 years old.  The company took delivery of the ships between December 19, 1955, and 1957.

The early post-war years were very profitable for the company, allowing it to reinvest in itself. At the same time, the Yugoslavian government became interested in building ships. This combination allowed Atlantska Plovidba to build a fleet of 20 ships of a combined  by 1965. In addition to tripling its tonnage, the new-building programe cut the average ship age to 17 years.

After building several new ships at Trieste, and the shipyards at Split and Trogir, Atlantska plovidba scrapped the last of the original nine ships in 1970. By 1975, the average ship age in the fleet was down to 7.5 years.

From 1991 to 1995, the company's operations were disturbed by the Croatian War of Independence. During the war, the Croatian ship registry was not recognized, and for a time, Atlantska Plovidba registered its ships with the Maltese Registry. At the conclusion of the war, Atlantska Plovidba, was second only to a state-owned company in registering its ships under the Croatian flag.

Early on, it ventured into shipping agency and travel agency, and later into hotels and airlines. The company owns three hotels, the Hilton Imperial,  Hotel Lapad, and Grand Hotel on the island of Lopud. In 2005, the company founded a charter airline company.

The company prides itself on its contribution to maritime education in Croatia.  It helped finance and open three institutions of higher learning, the Dubrovnik Maritime Nautical College in 1959, the Dubrovnik Maritime Engineer College in 1964, and Dubrovnik Maritime University in 1986.

Fleet
Atlantska plovidba manages a fleet of 11 bulk carriers of which 5 are panamax, 4 supramax and 2 handymax.

See also
Dubrovnik Airline

Notes

References

External links

Shipping companies of Croatia
Companies based in Dubrovnik
Companies listed on the Zagreb Stock Exchange
Transport companies established in 1955
1955 establishments in Croatia